Mart Järvik (born 21 February 1956) is an Estonian politician. He served as Ministry of Rural Affairs in the second cabinet of Prime Minister Jüri Ratas from 29 April 2019 to 25 November 2019. Arvo Aller was appointed as his successor. He is affiliated with the Conservative People's Party of Estonia (EKRE).

References 

Living people
1956 births
Place of birth missing (living people)
Government ministers of Estonia
21st-century Estonian politicians
Conservative People's Party of Estonia politicians
Agriculture ministers of Estonia